Sampson Stawell (6 October 1785 – 21 August 1849) was an Irish soldier and politician.

Stawell was born into an upper-class family; he was the nephew of the Earl of Bandon.  He joined the British Army, and became a lieutenant-colonel in the 12th Lancers, serving at the Battle of Waterloo.

At the 1832 UK general election, Stawell stood in Kinsale as a Whig, winning the seat with a majority of just six votes.  He stood down at the 1835 UK general election.

References

1785 births
1849 deaths
British Army officers
Members of the Parliament of the United Kingdom for County Cork constituencies (1801–1922)
UK MPs 1832–1835
Whig (British political party) MPs for Irish constituencies